Ochrosia hexandra is a species of flowering plant in the family Apocynaceae, native to the Japanese Volcano Islands. It was first described by Gen-ichi Koidzumi in 1918.

References

hexandra
Plants described in 1918
Flora of the Volcano Islands